Inflammable Material is the debut album by the Northern Irish punk band Stiff Little Fingers, released in 1979. Most of the album's tracks are about the "Troubles" and the grim reality of life in Northern Ireland with the songs containing themes of teenage boredom, sectarian violence, RUC (police) oppression, etc., urging people to "grab it and change it, it's yours" in what became their signature song "Alternative Ulster". The song "Rough Trade" is about the band's view of the music business as being dishonest, but they have since claimed it is not about their record label which happens to have the same name.

Reception

On its initial release, Paul Morley of the NME declared that "even more so than Never Mind The Bollocks – which turned out to be comedy – much more so than The Clash – which turned out to be quaint – as astonishing in its impact as The Ramones, Inflammable Material is the classic punk rock record." Morley went on to note the album was a "crushing contemporary commentary, brutally inspired by blatant bitter rebellion and frustration" concluding that "There are parts of Inflammable Material that are not just exciting or stimulating but quite humbling. It is a remarkable document."  Garry Bushell of Sounds also praised the album, declaring it "a magnificent slice of vintage punk played fast and frantic, and loaded with powerful lyrics and forceful hooks barked out with anger and conviction by the man with the permanent sore throat, vocalist/lead guitarist Jake Burns." Bushell concluded that "Stiffs to be one of the most impressive old style punk bands to have broken surface in recent times, and my worries are mostly for the future: will their music progress or stagnate?"

Track listing
All tracks composed by Jake Burns and Gordon Ogilvie; except where indicated
"Suspect Device" – 2:36
"State of Emergency" (Jake Burns) – 2:29
"Here We Are Nowhere" (Henry Cluney) – 1:00
"Wasted Life" (Jake Burns) – 3:10
"No More of That" (Henry Cluney) – 2:04
"Barbed Wire Love" – 3:33
"White Noise" – 1:57
"Breakout" (Jake Burns) – 3:04
"Law and Order" – 3:14
"Rough Trade" – 2:41
"Johnny Was" (Bob Marley) – 8:12
"Alternative Ulster" – 2:45
"Closed Groove" – 4:25

The 2001 EMI CD reissue added the following tracks:

The reissue includes the first part of an interview of Jake Burns by Alan Parker (the second part is included in the reissue of Nobody's Heroes).

Chart Position

This was the first album on an independent record label to enter the UK Top Twenty.

Personnel
Stiff Little Fingers
Jake Burns – vocals, guitar
Henry Cluney – guitar, vocals
Ali McMordie – bass, vocals
Brian Faloon – drums
with:
Andy Kelly – bassoon on "Alternative Ulster"
Technical
Geoff Travis – producer
Mayo Thompson – producer
Mike Kemp – engineer
Doug Bennett – producer
Ed Hollis – producer on "Alternative Ulster"

References

Sources
 
 

Stiff Little Fingers albums
1979 debut albums
Albums produced by Mayo Thompson
Rough Trade Records albums
Celluloid Records albums
Restless Records albums
EMI Records albums
Chrysalis Records albums
Parlophone albums
Works about The Troubles (Northern Ireland)